Pavlo Yurievich Shylko (Ukrainian: Павло Юрійович Шилько) (also known as DJ Pasha, born 6 August 1977 in Mezhdurechensk) is a Ukrainian radio and television presenter. He co-hosted Eurovision Song Contest 2005 with Maria Efrosinina (Masha) at the Palace of Sports in Kyiv.

Career
His career began around 1996 as a radio DJ for the Ukrainian radio station Gala Radio.

He wrote the song for Ukraine in the Eurovision Song Contest 2006 "Show Me Your Love" performed by Tina Karol. In the final, it had received 145 points, pushing it into 7th place. In addition he arranged the Ukrainian commentary on the 2003 contest, the 2006 contest and the Fiftieth Anniversary Special. He was later named the spokesperson of Eurovision Song Contest 2017.

See also
 List of Eurovision Song Contest presenters

References

External links

Living people
1977 births
Ukrainian DJs
Ukrainian television presenters
Ukrainian radio presenters
Ukrainian record producers
People from Mezhdurechensk, Kemerovo Oblast
Taras Shevchenko National University of Kyiv alumni